During 1992, tropical cyclones formed within seven different bodies of water called basins. To date, 111 tropical cyclones formed, of which 101 were given names by various weather agencies. Five Category 5 tropical cyclones were formed in 1992.

Summary

Systems

January

February

March

April

May 

May 1992 was the record-breaking least active month ever recorded in the history of worldwide tropical cyclogenesis with only one tropical cyclone within the month – BOB 01 – the first cyclonic storm of the 1992 North Indian Ocean cyclone season. Although Tropical Cyclone Innis was active in the month, it was counted for the month of April, as that was the month it formed in.

June

July

August

September

October

November

December

Global effects 
There are a total of 9 tropical cyclone basins, 7 are seasonal and two are non-seasonal, thus all 8 basins except the Mediterranean are active. In this table, data from all these basins are added.

See also 

 Tropical cyclones by year
 List of earthquakes in 1992
 Tornadoes of 1992

References

External links

Regional Specialized Meteorological Centers
 US National Hurricane Center – North Atlantic, Eastern Pacific
 Central Pacific Hurricane Center – Central Pacific
 Japan Meteorological Agency – NW Pacific
 India Meteorological Department – Bay of Bengal and the Arabian Sea
 Météo-France – La Reunion – South Indian Ocean from 30°E to 90°E
 Fiji Meteorological Service – South Pacific west of 160°E, north of 25° S

Tropical Cyclone Warning Centers
 Meteorology, Climatology, and Geophysical Agency of Indonesia – South Indian Ocean from 90°E to 141°E, generally north of 10°S
 Australian Bureau of Meteorology (TCWC's Perth, Darwin & Brisbane) – South Indian Ocean & South Pacific Ocean from 90°E to 160°E, generally south of 10°S
 Papua New Guinea National Weather Service – South Pacific Ocean from 141°E to 160°E, generally north of 10°S
 Meteorological Service of New Zealand Limited – South Pacific west of 160°E, south of 25°S

Tropical cyclones by year
1992 Atlantic hurricane season
1992 Pacific hurricane season
1992 Pacific typhoon season
1992 North Indian Ocean cyclone season
1991–92 Australian region cyclone season
1992–93 Australian region cyclone season
1991–92 South Pacific cyclone season
1992–93 South Pacific cyclone season
1991–92 South-West Indian Ocean cyclone season
1992–93 South-West Indian Ocean cyclone season
1992-related lists